Love at the End of the World is the third full-length album from Canadian rock musician Sam Roberts. The album was first released in Canada on May 20, 2008, in the Netherlands on September 19, in the UK on October 13, and in the US on February 3, 2009. Love at the End of the World debuted at #1 on the Canadian Albums Chart, selling 9,000 copies in its first week. The album was certified Gold in Canada in November 2008. It won the 2009 Juno Award for Rock Album of the Year.

The album cover is based on an illustration by Elisabeth Moch.

Singles 
"Them Kids" was the first single released, originally through iTunes on March 4. The music video debuted on April 22. On the week of August 14, "Them Kids" reached No. 1 on the Canadian indie chart, the R3-30.

Reception 
The album received positive reviews from Allmusic and CHARTattack, with a mixed review in Popmatters.

Track listing

iTunes Bonus Tracks
The following tracks were available with the iTunes pre-order of the album.

  "Them Kids [K-OS Remix]" - 3:31

References

External links
Official website
Love At The End Of The World - Love At The End Of The World official site

2008 albums
Sam Roberts albums
Juno Award for Rock Album of the Year albums